Cleavage may refer to:

Science
 Cleavage (crystal), the way in which a crystal or mineral tends to split
 Cleavage (embryo), the division of cells in an early embryo
 Cleavage (geology), foliation of rock perpendicular to stress, a result of ductile deformation
 Cleave (fiber), a controlled break in an optical fiber
 Bond cleavage, in chemistry and biochemistry, the splitting of chemical bonds
 Cleavage factor, a protein complex that helps cleave of a newly synthesized pre-messenger RNA (mRNA)
 Cleavage furrow, in cell biology, the indentation that begins the process of cleavage, by which animal cells undergo cytokinesis
 Proteolysis, also called peptide cleavage, the breaking down of proteins

Anatomy
 Cleavage (breasts), the partial exposure of the gap between a woman's breasts
 Buttock cleavage, the minor exposure of the buttocks and the gluteal cleft between them
 Toe cleavage, the partial exposure of toes in shoes
 Teeth cleavage or tooth cleavage, slang for diastema, the gap between a person's two front teeth

Other uses
 Cleavage (politics), the divisions of society that cause people to vote differently

See also
Cleave (disambiguation)
Cleaver (disambiguation)